8  (Eight) is an upcoming Indian Tamil-language film directed by Vijay Kaviraj. The film features Bharath and Pooja Jhaveri in the lead roles, while Soori and Nagineedu portray other pivotal roles. The film began production during early 2018.

Cast 
Bharath
Pooja Jhaveri as Valarmathi
Soori
Robo Shankar
Devadarshini
Nagineedu

Production 
Vijay Kaviraj, a former associate director of S. A. Chandrasekhar, made his directorial debut with the film and convinced musician John Peter to co-produce the venture, after initially planning to just approach him for the soundtrack. Bharath was selected to play the lead role, while Pooja Jhaveri was signed as the heroine. Said to be based on the eight stages of life, the makers also cast comedians including Soori, Robo Shankar and Devadarshini in key roles.

By March 2018, 60% of the shoot was revealed to be completed following two schedules in Chennai, Pattukottai and Kerala.

References

Unreleased Tamil-language films